Samuela Polo Asi (born June 7, 1977 in Moata'a) is a Samoan rugby union player. He plays as a prop.

Career
He first played for Samoa as tighthead prop during the quarter-final match of the 1999 Rugby World Cup against Scotland, at Murrayfield . His last match for Samoa was against Fiji, at Tokyo, on July 8, 2001.

Notes

External links

Samuela P. Asi at New Zealand Rugby History

1974 births
Living people
Samoan rugby union players
Samoan expatriate sportspeople in New Zealand
Rugby union props
Samoa international rugby union players
Bay of Plenty rugby union players
Counties Manukau rugby union players
Expatriate rugby union players in New Zealand
Samoan expatriate rugby union players